Brennan Cox (born 13 August 1998) is a professional Australian rules footballer playing for the Fremantle Football Club in the Australian Football League (AFL).

Early career

Originally from Woodville South in Adelaide, Cox played for Woodville-West Torrens in the South Australian National Football League (SANFL) in 2016.  He also represented South Australia at the 2016 AFL Under 18 Championships and was named as the centre-half back in the All-Australian team.

AFL career

He was recruited as a versatile player to Fremantle with their third selection, 41st overall, in the 2016 AFL draft. He made his AFL debut in round 12 of the 2017 AFL season against Brisbane at the Gabba, after playing well for Fremantle's reserves team, Peel Thunder, in the West Australian Football League (WAFL). In round 12 of the 2018 AFL season he was nominated for the 2018 AFL Rising Star award.

After starting his career playing mostly as a forward between 2017 and 2019 Cox made his debut as a defender during the 2020 AFL season. Cox made a case for All-Australian selection during the 2022 AFL season with his ability to shutdown some of the best forwards in the competition, he was named in the initial 44 man squad but didn't make the final 22. Cox played 21 of 22 games a career best and also averaged 16.2 disposals a game which is elite for a key defender.

Statistics
 Statistics are correct to the end of round 22 2022

|- style="background-color: #EAEAEA"
! scope="row" style="text-align:center" | 2017
|
| 36 || 10 || 4 || 11 || 56 || 56 || 112 || 47 || 16 || 0.4 || 1.1 || 5.6 || 5.6 || 11.2 || 4.7 || 1.6 || 0
|-
! scope="row" style="text-align:center" | 2018
|
| 36 || 16 || 18 || 14 || 105 || 80 || 185 || 70 || 39 || 1.1 || 0.9 || 6.6 || 5.0 || 11.6 || 4.4 || 2.4 || 1
|- style="background-color: #EAEAEA"
! scope="row" style="text-align:center" | 2019
|
| 36 || 8 || 5 || 2 || 31 || 45 || 76 || 29 || 20 || 0.6 || 0.3 || 3.9 || 5.6 || 9.5 || 3.6 || 2.5 || 0
|-
! scope="row" style="text-align:center" | 2020
|
| 36 || 13 || 0 || 0 || 83 || 65 || 148 || 51 || 11 || 0.0 || 0.0 || 6.4 || 5.0 || 11.4 || 3.9 || 0.8 || 0
|- style="background-color: #EAEAEA"
! scope="row" style="text-align:center" | 2021
|
| 36 || 12 || 0 || 0 || 87 || 55 || 142 || 56 || 11 || 0.0 || 0.0 || 7.3 || 4.6 || 11.8 || 4.7 || 0.9 || 0
|-
! scope="row" style="text-align:center" | 2022
|
| 36 || 20 || 1 || 1 || 236 || 91 || 327 || 127 || 22 || 0.0 || 0.0 || 11.8 || 4.5 || 16.3 || 6.3 || 1.1 || TBA
|- class="sortbottom"
! colspan=3| Career
! 79
! 28
! 28
! 598
! 392
! 990
! 380
! 119
! 0.3
! 0.3
! 7.5
! 4.9
! 12.5
! 4.8
! 1.5
! 1
|}

Notes

References

External links
 
 
 Brennan Cox's WAFL statistics

1998 births
Living people
Woodville-West Torrens Football Club players
Peel Thunder Football Club players
Fremantle Football Club players
Australian rules footballers from Adelaide